Snydertown, Pennsylvania, may refer to:
 Snydertown, Centre County, Pennsylvania
 Snydertown, Fayette County, Pennsylvania
 Snydertown, Huntingdon County, Pennsylvania
 Snydertown, Northumberland County, Pennsylvania, a borough
 Snydertown, Westmoreland County, Pennsylvania